The Burns Cottage in Atlanta, Georgia (USA), is a replica of the birthplace of Robert Burns in Scotland. The Atlanta cottage was built by the Burns Club Atlanta in 1911, using measurements of the original cottage. The interior was adapted for club use, with a meeting room replacing the barn and byre.

Gallery

References

External links

Cultural infrastructure completed in 1911
Buildings and structures in Atlanta
National Register of Historic Places in Atlanta
Clubhouses on the National Register of Historic Places in Georgia (U.S. state)